Kenneth Brailey Cumberland  (1 October 1913 – 17 April 2011) was a New Zealand geography academic and local-body politician.

Academic career
After a bachelor's in geography at Nottingham University College and a MSc at University College, London, Cumberland emigrated to Canterbury College, Christchurch (now the University of Canterbury) immediately before the outbreak of World War II. After the war he moved to Auckland University College (now the University of Auckland). In each place he played a key role in the establishment of teaching of physical geography. After retiring in 1978 he made and narrated a television series, Landmarks, on the geography of New Zealand.

Political career
Cumberland was an associate of Dove-Myer Robinson and were both members of the Drainage League that opposed the Brown's Bay scheme supported by the then mayor John Allum. Later, he was elected to the Auckland City Council in 1953 as part of Robinson's United Independents ticket. He was re-elected in both 1956 and 1959; in the latter he was on the "Civic Reform" ticket that briefly succeeded the United Independents. He was the leader of the Civic Reform group at the 1959 election.

Honours
Cumberland was elected a Fellow of the Royal Society of New Zealand in 1973. In the 1982 Queen's Birthday Honours, he was appointed a Commander of the Order of the British Empire, for services to geography and the community.

Death
Cumberland died on 17 April 2011, aged 97. He was survived by two of his children.

Notes

References

1913 births
2011 deaths
People from Bradford
Alumni of the University of Nottingham
Alumni of University College London
University of Auckland alumni
English emigrants to New Zealand
New Zealand geographers
New Zealand documentary filmmakers
Academic staff of the University of Canterbury
Academic staff of the University of Auckland
New Zealand Commanders of the Order of the British Empire
Auckland City Councillors
Fellows of the Royal Society of New Zealand